Kushinagar International Airport is an international airport with only domestic flights as of now, serving Kushinagar, Uttar Pradesh, India. In August 2021, the airport was licensed to operate as a customs notified airport, facilitating the movement of international passengers and Buddhist pilgrims.

History
The central government approved a Viability Gap Funding (VGF) of 20% for the construction of Kushinagar Airport in 2013. The airport was to be built through a joint venture between the State Government and the Airports Authority of India (AAI).

The project was initially intended to be developed on the public-private partnership model at an estimated cost of ₹ 354 crores. The State Government selected IL&FS Infrastructure Development Company Limited as project consultants. The design was inspired by inverted canopies called "Ulta Chaata". The Government had received 15 technical bids in 2013 from infrastructure companies for the development of the airport.

In January 2014, the state cabinet cleared the project and approved the financial bid document. Despite several attempts to reduce the cost and the size of the project, the government could not convince private payers about its viability. In May 2015, the state government decided to take the support of Airport Authority of India to move ahead with the project.

On 24 June 2020, Prime Minister Narendra Modi recognized the Kushinagar Airport as an international airport, in part to attract Buddhist pilgrims. In February 2021, the airport received all necessary clearances from the Directorate General of Civil Aviation (DGCA) to be recognized as the international airport, becoming the third international airport in Uttar Pradesh after Lucknow and Varanasi.

On 20 October 2021, PM Modi officially inaugurated the airport during Abhidhamma Day celebrations at Kushinagar, stating that it would boost the aviation sector and help increase international tourism from Buddhist pilgrims around the world. On that day, Sri Lanka's Minister for Youth and Sports Namal Rajapaksa and more than a hundred members of the Buddhist clergy landed at the inauguration of the airport as the first international flight landing. On 26 November 2021, the first passenger flight of SpiceJet landed at the airport from Delhi with 74 passengers, becoming the first scheduled flight to land at Kushinagar International Airport.

Location 

Facilities 
The airport apron can accommodate 5 Boeing 737-900s at a time.

Airlines and destinations

As of February 2023, SpiceJet is the only airline operating from Kushinagar Airport, providing Delhi-Kushinagar flights six times a week. Jyotiraditya Scindia, Minister of Civil Aviation, said that flights to Mumbai & Kolkata would also be operational soon in the future, at least by 2023.

References

Airports in Uttar Pradesh
International airports in India
Kushinagar district